Vera Albreht (12 February 1895 – 25 May 1971) was a Slovene poet, writer, publicist and translator.

Life
She was born as Vera Kessler in Krško into the well-to-do family. Her mother was Marija Kessler, née Trenz, an ethnic German socialite, while her father Rudolph Kessler was a Slovene. Her parents' home in Ljubljana was a well known meeting point of the Slovenian literary scene at the time, frequented among others also by Ivan Cankar and Oton Župančič, who married Vera's sister Ana Kessler. She studied at the University of Vienna, but never completed her studies due to the outbreak of World War I. In 1919 she married the poet and critic Fran Albreht.

During World War II, she and her husband actively participated with the Liberation Front of the Slovenian People. They were both imprisoned by the Italian fascist authorities on a number of occasions between 1941 and 1943. In 1944, she was sent to Ravensbrück concentration camp by the Germans. After the war she moved with her husband to Ljubljana where she worked as a publicist and at the Slovene center of International PEN. She died in Ljubljana.

Works
PROSE

1957 – Lupinica (youth proze)
1960 – Nekoč pod Gorjanci (Once Upon a Time under the Gorjanci) (youth proze)
1964 – Babica in trije vnučki (Granny and Three Grandchildren) (youth proze)

POETRY

1950 – Mi gradimo (We build) (youth poetry) 
1950 – Orehi (Wallnuts) (youth poetry)
1955 – Vesela abeceda (Happy Alphabet) (youth poetry)
1958 – Živali pri delu in jelu (Animals at Work) (youth poetry)
1965 – Pustov god (Pust's celebration) (youth poetry)
1967 – Jutro (Morning) (youth poetry)
1967 – Pri igri (At Games) (youth poetry)
1967 – Večer (Evening) (youth poetry)
1969 – ABC (youth poetry)
1972 – Mornar (The Sailor) (youth poetry)
1972 – Slikarka (The Painter) (youth poetry)
1977 – Ravensbriške pesmi (Ravensbrück poems)(poetry)
1978 – Dobro jutro (Good Morning) (youth poetry)

See also
List of Slovenian language poets
Slovenian literature
Culture of Slovenia
Yugoslav People's Liberation War

References 

1895 births
1971 deaths
People from Krško
Slovenian women poets
Slovenian poets
Ravensbrück concentration camp survivors
Slovenian people of German descent
20th-century poets
20th-century Slovenian women writers
Burials at Žale